Qingcheng railway station is a railway station located in Qingcheng District, Qingyuan, Guangdong, China. It opened with the Guangzhou–Qingyuan intercity railway on 30 November 2020.

References 

Railway stations in Guangdong
Railway stations in China opened in 2020